Death Row Records full discography with all albums, compilations, EP's & singles release.

Studio albums

Compilation albums

Soundtrack albums

Singles

References 

Hip hop discographies
Discographies of American artists
Discographies of American record labels